The 2022 Tulsa Golden Hurricane football team represented the University of Tulsa as a member of the American Athletic Conference (AAC) during the 2022 NCAA Division I FBS football season. The Golden Hurricane were led by eighth-year head coach Philip Montgomery and played their home games at Skelly Field at H. A. Chapman Stadium in Tulsa, Oklahoma.

Previous season

The Golden Hurricane finished the 2021 season with 7–6 overall record, 5–3 in AAC play. The Golden Hurricane won the 2021 Myrtle Beach Bowl, 30–17 over the Old Dominion Monarchs.

Schedule

Roster

Game summaries

at Wyoming

Northern Illinois

Jacksonville State

at No. 16 Ole Miss

Cincinnati

at Navy

at Temple

SMU

No. 19 Tulane

at Memphis

South Florida

at Houston

References

Tulsa
Tulsa Golden Hurricane football seasons
Tulsa Golden Hurricane football